Bekim Isufi (born 2 January 1976) is a Kosovan professional football coach and former player who is the current assistant manager of Kosovo national under-21 team.

Club career

Drita
Isufi became a famous football player in Kosovo, while playing for Drita in the 2002–03 season and where he had won captain armband for the first time in the Football Superleague of Kosovo.

International career
On 7 September 2002. Isufi made his debut with Kosovo in a friendly match against Albania after coming on as a substitute at 66th minute in place of Xhevdet Llumnica.

Coaching career

Fourth term at Drita
On 5 November 2017, Isufi became the manager of Drita for a second time, and did the miracle finishing the 2017–18 season as the champion of 29 unbeaten matches and assure participation at the 2018–19 UEFA Champions League preliminary round. On 26 June 2018, Drita beat Andorran side FC Santa Coloma at Victoria Stadium in Gibraltar and became the first Kosovar side to win a UEFA Champions League match.

On 13 September 2018, he resigned from the position of the coach after Drita loss against Llapi and under the direction of Isufi, Drita was the champion of the 2017–18 Football Superleague of Kosovo, won the 2018 Kosovar Supercup and as well made the team as most successful Kosovan team in European competitions since Kosovo was accepted in UEFA.

References

External links

Living people
1974 births
People from Gjilan
Kosovo Albanians
Association football midfielders
Kosovan footballers
Kosovo pre-2014 international footballers
Football Superleague of Kosovo players
FC Prishtina players
FC Drita players
KF Flamurtari players
Kosovan football managers
FC Drita managers
KF Ferizaj managers